Aaron Doherty is an Irish Gaelic footballer who plays for Naomh Columba and the Donegal county team.

He attended Coláiste na Carraige and Dublin Institute of Technology. He is from near Teelin, in the parish of Gleann Cholm Cille. He has also played association football for St Catherine's and Letterbarrow Celtic.

Doherty played football at minor level for Donegal.

He was first called into the Donegal senior team in 2019, following the departure of other players. He won an Ulster Senior Football Championship medal shortly afterwards.

Doherty started Donegal's fifth fixture of the 2022 National Football League against Monaghan, scoring a point. He then started the sixth fixture against Dublin at Croke Park, scoring another point.

Doherty made a substitute appearance in the 2022 Ulster Senior Football Championship final, scoring an extra-time point from a mark. He had earlier made substitute appearances in the quarter-final victory over Armagh and the semi-final victory over Cavan. He started the 2022 All-Ireland Senior Football Championship qualifier loss to Armagh, scoring a point.

Honours
 Ulster Senior Football Championship: 2019
 EirGrid U20 Football Championship Player of the Year: 2020

References

2000s births
Living people
Donegal inter-county Gaelic footballers
Gaelic football backs
Gaelic footballers who switched code
Naomh Columba Gaelic footballers
St Catherine's F.C. players